Pfeiffer is an unincorporated community in Independence County, Arkansas, United States. Pfeiffer is located on U.S. Route 167, northeast of Batesville.

References

Unincorporated communities in Independence County, Arkansas
Unincorporated communities in Arkansas